The National World War I Museum and Memorial in Kansas City, Missouri was opened in 1926 as the Liberty Memorial. In 2004, it was designated by the United States Congress as the country's official war memorial and museum dedicated to World War I. A non-profit organization manages it in cooperation with the Kansas City Board of Parks and Recreation Commissioners. The museum focuses on global events from the causes of World War I before 1914 through the 1918 armistice and 1919 Paris Peace Conference. Visitors enter the exhibit space within the  facility across a glass bridge above a field of 9,000 red poppies, each representing 1,000 combatant deaths.

The museum was temporarily closed in 1994 for renovations and reopened in December 2006 with an expanded facility to exhibit an artifact collection begun in 1920.

History

Liberty Memorial Association
Soon after World War I ended, a group of 40 prominent Kansas City residents formed the Liberty Memorial Association (LMA) to create a memorial to those who had served in the war. For a president, they chose lumber baron and philanthropist Robert A. Long, who had personally donated a large sum of money. James Madison Kemper was treasurer of the association, who had been briefly in 1919 the President of City Center Bank that was founded by his father, William T. Kemper. J.C. Nichols, a real estate developer, was a lead proponent of the Liberty Monument. William Volker, businessman and philanthropist, helped the city acquire the land for the memorial. George Kessler was the landscape designer.

In 1919, the LMA led a fund drive that included 83,000 contributors and collected more than $2.5 million in less than two weeks (equivalent to $ in ), driven by what museum curator Doran Cart has described as "complete, unbridled patriotism". This prevented the monetary problems that had plagued the Bunker Hill Monument for the American Revolutionary War in Boston one century earlier.

Dedications

The groundbreaking ceremony on November 1, 1921, was attended by 200,000 people, including Vice President Calvin Coolidge, Lieutenant General Baron Jacques of Belgium, Admiral of the Fleet Lord Beatty of Great Britain, General Armando Diaz of Italy, Marshal Ferdinand Foch of France, General of the Armies John J. Pershing of the United States, and 60,000 members of the American Legion. The local veteran chosen to present flags to the commanders was a Kansas City haberdasher, Harry S. Truman, who would later serve as 33rd President of the United States from 1945 to 1953. The finished monument was dedicated on November 11, 1926, by 30th President Coolidge, in the presence of Queen Marie of Romania. Coolidge announced that the memorial "...has not been raised to commemorate war and victory, but rather the results of war and victory which are embodied in peace and liberty ... Today I return in order that I may place the official sanction of the national government upon one of the most elaborate and impressive memorials that adorn our country. The magnitude of this memorial, and the broad base of popular support on which it rests, can scarcely fail to excite national wonder and admiration."

Renovations
In 1935, bas reliefs by Walker Hancock of Jacques, Beatty, Diaz, Foch, and Pershing were unveiled.

In 1961 the monument was rededicated by former President Harry S. Truman. The local effort to restore the fading monument was headed by Armand Glenn, the local head of the central district legion. Local company Hallmark provided support, and on November 11, 1961, on its 40th anniversary, there was a large dedication ceremony on the memorial grounds. A crowd of 15,000 watched Truman preside over the service.

In 1981–1982, corresponding to its 60th anniversary, the building revealed new exhibits under improved lighting sources.

The memorial was closed in 1994 due to safety concerns because aging had produced problems with drainage and the original construction. Local shopping malls voluntarily helped to display part of the museum collection while the memorial was unavailable. When the poor condition of the building became an embarrassment for the city, Kansas City voters in 1998 passed a limited-run sales tax to support the restoration. Plans were made to expand the site with a museum to accommodate the LMA's growing collection. Local, national, and international support provided  (equivalent to $ in ), ultimately revealed at its 2006 reopening.

In 2004, Congress named it the nation's official World War I museum, and construction started on a new  expansion and the Edward Jones Research Center underneath the original memorial. The year that this was completed, Liberty Memorial was designated a National Historic Landmark on September 20, 2006.

It included $170,000 in energy efficiency upgrades and improvements to the artificial flame atop the tower. After several months of dormancy, the flame was relit on February 1, 2013. Security was upgraded, certain limestone sections were repaired, and the brush was removed.

An addition planned for completion in 2018 is the Wylie Gallery, to occupy unused space on the east side of the museum building. It is part of a $6.4 million upgrade made possible by a fundraising campaign coinciding with the tenth anniversary of the museum's 2006 reopening. The gallery houses traveling exhibits from around the world.

Current designation
On December 19, 2014, President Barack Obama signed legislation recognizing it as "a 'World War I Museum and Memorial'", which resulted in the redesignation of the entire site as the National World War I Museum and Memorial.

Design
The national design competition was managed by Thomas R. Kimball, a former president of the American Institute of Architects (AIA). After discord within the organization locally, the design contract was finally awarded to New York architect Harold Van Buren Magonigle. A disagreement between the Kansas City Chapter of AIA members and Kimball over the rules caused almost half of the local members to resign in April 1922. They immediately formed the Architectural League of Kansas City, which was merged into the AIA in the early 1930s. Unlike the AIA at the time, the Architectural League of Kansas City provided membership to less experienced architects and drafters and provided social and educational opportunities. Regardless of the controversy, many local architects submitted entries, including those who resigned from the AIA. The jury unanimously awarded the contract to Magonigle.

Liberty Tower
The main doors at the bottom of a large set of stairs are made from ornamental bronze, and the walls of the first-floor lobby are finished in Kasota stone quarried in Kasota, Minnesota. The first-floor corridor and the grand stairway are finished in travertine imported from Italy. At night, the top of the  memorial tower emits a flame effect from steam illuminated by bright red and orange lights. The illusion of a burning pyre can be seen from some distance.

The tower is crowned with four sculptures, the Guardian Spirits.

External buildings
The tower and buildings are designed in the classical Egyptian Revival architecture style with a limestone exterior. The foundation was constructed using sawed granite, and the exterior ground-level walls are made of Bedford stone. On opposite sides of the main deck of the Liberty Memorial are Exhibition Hall and Memory Hall. Memory Hall includes murals originally painted for the Panthéon de la Guerre in Paris, and adapted by LeRoy Daniel MacMorris in the 1950s.

Between each hall and the tower, above the museum entrance, sit two stone Assyrian sphinxes, named "Memory" and "Future", covering their faces with their wings. Memory faces East, shielding its face from the horrors of the European battlefields. Its counterpart faces West and shrowds its eyes from a future yet unseen.

Main museum building
The underground portion was designed by Ralph Appelbaum Associates and expanded the original facilities. The north side of the museum, opposite the main entrance and below the Liberty tower, contains a large work of art upon its wall, which is visible from neighboring Union Station.

Grounds
The grounds were designed by George Kessler who is also famous for his City Beautiful design for the Kansas City park and boulevard system. Kessler Road borders the west side.

Just outside the museum entrance is a large elliptical fountain, and on each side is a tapering staircase ascending to the memorial deck above. The approach from the south contains the Walk of Honor, a series of engraved bricks in three sections commemorating veterans of World War I, veterans of all wars, and honored civilians.

Museum features

 Two main galleries containing exhibitions with period artifacts. The first focuses on the beginning of the Great War prior to U.S. involvement, while the second focuses on the United States' military and civilian involvement in the war and efforts for peace. Items in these collections include:
 A Renault FT tank
 Uniforms such as Paul von Hindenburg's Model 1915 Field Jacket
 A 1917 Harley-Davidson Model J motorcycle
 A 1918 Ford Model T ambulance
 General John J. Pershing's headquarter flag
 Munitions
 Maps and photographs
 International propaganda posters
 Replica trenches
 State-of-the-art interactive displays
 Sound booths with audio recordings of the period
 Two theaters that provide visitors with an educational narrative. One precedes the first gallery, and a larger one is passed through to enter the second gallery.
 The Edward Jones Research Center, carrying 75,000 archival documents, 9,500 library titles, and additional objects.
 R.A. Long Education Center: A multi-purpose conference room and classroom
 J.C. Nichols Auditorium for special events
 The Over There Café featuring flags, music, artwork, and menu items inspired by "the people and places of the Great War".
 A museum store

Tree of Peace 
On the North Lawn was planted a memorial tree called "The Tree of Peace" in honor of those who fought and died in World War I. The international project "Tree of Peace" officially represents Slovakia under the brand called "Good Idea SlovakiaIdeas from Slovakia". The trademark license was granted by the Ministry of Foreign and European Affairs of the Slovak Republic. The planting of the memorial tree was carried out under the auspice of the Honorary Consulate of Slovakia to the United States and the Consulate General of the Slovak Republic in New York City.

See also

 National Civil War Museum
 National World War II Museum
 List of National Historic Landmarks in Missouri
 National Register of Historic Places listings in Jackson County, Missouri: Downtown Kansas City

References

Bibliography

Further reading
  Marsh, Hannah. "Memory in World War I American Museum Exhibits" (MA thesis, Kansas State University, 2015, online)

External links

 Official website
 Animation and explanation of museum logo
 National World War I Museum and Memorial  at Google Cultural Institute
 Aber, Sarajane Sandusky, "An Architectural History of the Liberty Memorial in Kansas City, Missouri". University of Missouri-Kansas City, 1918–1935.
 Millstein, Cydney, "Historic American Buildings Survey of Liberty Memorial". Architectural and Historical Research, April 1, 2000.
 Yoho, Carol, "National World War I Museum at Liberty Memorial", Washburn University, 2009.

1926 establishments in Missouri
1926 sculptures
Art Deco sculptures and memorials
Cultural infrastructure completed in 1926
Limestone sculptures in the United States
Military and war museums in Missouri
Monuments and memorials in Missouri
Museums in Kansas City, Missouri
World War I Museum and Memorial
World War I Museum and Memorial
Stone sculptures in Missouri
Towers in Missouri
World War I memorials in the United States
World War I museums in the United States
Downtown Kansas City
Museums established in 1926
World War I Museum and Memorial
World War I Museum and Memorial